The discography of Anberlin, an American alternative rock band, consists of seven studio albums, two extended plays, one compilation album and seven singles. Prior to the release of their fourth studio album, Anberlin had sold over 400,000 albums.

Anberlin's first studio album, Blueprints for the Black Market (2003), was the first of three to be released on Tooth & Nail Records. The album's lead single "Readyfuels" spurred the album's sales upwards of 60,000 copies, but the album failed to feature on any national charts. The band's second album, Never Take Friendship Personal (2005), peaked at No. 144 on the Billboard 200 and No. 3 on the Top Heatseekers chart. Anberlin's first single to feature on a national chart came from the album, with "Paperthin Hymn" peaking at No. 38 on the Alternative Songs chart. The album went on to sell over 150,000 copies, surpassing the previous album and their eventuating third album.

In December 2006, Anberlin released the Godspeed EP, featuring the upcoming third album's lead single "Godspeed". Their third album, Cities, was released in early 2007, peaking at No. 19 on the Billboard 200 and selling in excess of 100,000 copies. Following the album's success, the band announced they had signed with major record label Universal Republic. Their final release on Tooth & Nail Records was Lost Songs, a compilation album of B-sides, demos, acoustics and covers.

Anberlin released their fourth studio album and first on a major label, in September 2008. New Surrender peaked at No. 13 on the Billboard 200, the band's highest chart performance. The first single from the album was a re-recording of "Feel Good Drag", which was originally from Never Take Friendship Personal. It claimed No. 1 on the Alternative Songs chart, after a record 29 weeks in the chart.

Studio albums

Compilation albums

Live albums

Extended plays

Singles 

Notes

A"Feel Good Drag" did not enter the Billboard Hot 100, but peaked at number eight on the Bubbling Under Hot 100 Singles chart, which acts as a 25-song extension to the Hot 100.

Music videos 

Notes

A Acquastrada was a music video directing company.

Other appearances

References

Rock music group discographies
Discographies of American artists
Anberlin